Ryan Jack Barnett (born 23 September 1999) is an English professional footballer who plays as a winger for  club Wrexham AFC.

Career

Shrewsbury Town
Barnett joined the Shrewsbury Town youth system in 2007, and received his first call-up to the senior squad by manager Paul Hurst on 26 December 2016, where he was an unused substitute in an away EFL League One match at Bolton Wanderers. He signed a two-and-a-half-year professional contract with the club in February 2017 - with the option of a further year - whilst still a first-year scholar.

The following season, Barnett made his professional debut as a substitute in a 3−0 victory against West Bromwich Albion U21s in an EFL Trophy group-stage match, coming on in the 67th minute in place of Lenell John-Lewis. He made his English Football League debut on 23 October 2018, coming on for the last two minutes in place of Greg Docherty in a 3−1 home win against Barnsley, under Hurst's replacement, John Askey.

Barnett joined National League North side AFC Telford United on an initial one-month loan on 10 November 2018. He scored his first career goal on 15 December to open a 4–3 win at Farsley Celtic in the first round of the FA Trophy. He returned to his parent club to play in an EFL Trophy tie against Port Vale, playing the whole ninety minutes and scoring in the resulting penalty-shoot out, as Shrewsbury bowed out of the competition following a 1−1 draw. On 10 January 2019, he returned to AFC Telford for the rest of the season.

In May 2019, it was confirmed that Shrewsbury had taken up the one-year option on Barnett's contract, committing him to the club until summer 2020. On 7 November that year, he joined Telford on loan once again, until the end of the season.  

After the 2019–20 National League was ended early due to the COVID-19 pandemic, Barnett returned to his parent club and signed a new one-year contract extension with the option of an additional year in June 2020. He scored his first goal for Shrewsbury Town in a 3−0 victory over Newcastle United Under−21s in an EFL Trophy group-stage match on 23 September of the same year.

On 8 February 2021, Barnett joined National League North leaders Gloucester City on a one-month loan deal.

On 18 March 2021, Barnett joined National League side Solihull Moors on a one-month loan.

On 12 May 2021 it was announced that he would leave Shrewsbury at the end of the season, following the expiry of his contract.

Solihull Moors
After spending time on loan with the club the following season, Barnett returned to Solihull Moors in June 2021, on a two-year permanent deal following his release from Shrewsbury.

Career statistics

References

External links 

1999 births
Living people
Sportspeople from Shrewsbury
English footballers
Association football midfielders
Shrewsbury Town F.C. players
AFC Telford United players
Gloucester City A.F.C. players
Solihull Moors F.C. players
Wrexham A.F.C. players
English Football League players
National League (English football) players